Maggie Kalka (October 20, 1912 – July 22, 1996) was a Finnish sprint canoeist who competed in the late 1930s. She won a gold medal in the K-1 600 m event at the 1938 ICF Canoe Sprint World Championships in Vaxholm.

Kalka also competed as a fencer at the 1952 Summer Olympics in Helsinki, but was eliminated in the heats of the women's foil event.

References

External links

1912 births
1996 deaths
Fencers at the 1952 Summer Olympics
Finnish female canoeists
Finnish female foil fencers
Olympic fencers of Finland
ICF Canoe Sprint World Championships medalists in kayak